Gleisdreieck (literally meaning triangle of rails in German) may refer to: 

Gleisdreieck (Berlin U-Bahn), a U-Bahn station in the city of Berlin in Germany
Gleisdreieck (Bochum), a district of the city of Bochum in North Rhine-Westphalia, Germany
Gleisdreieck (album), a 2017 album by recording artist Joy Denalane
Wye (rail), a type of railway junction comprising a triangle of rails
 Dangerous Crossing (1937 film), a German drama film